The Beach Boys On Tour: 1968 is a live album recorded by the Beach Boys, released on December 14, 2018 by Capitol Records. It compiles eight of their full concert performances from 1968.

Background

These performances were part of the band's 1968 tour in the U.S. on the back of their recent studio album Friends as well as for the upcoming 20/20 album during the later U.K. dates. The compilation also features the entirety of the original Live in London release from 1970.

Track listing

Personnel

Partial credits sourced from Craig Slowinski.
 Carl Wilson – vocals, lead guitar
 Dennis Wilson – vocals, drums
 Mike Love – vocals, electro-Theremin on "Good Vibrations"
 Al Jardine – vocals, rhythm guitar
 Bruce Johnston – bass guitar, vocals

Additional personnel
 Dennis Dragon - percussion (April - August 1968)
 unknown (possibly John Guerin) - percussion, drums on "Friends" and "Little Bird" (July 1968)
Daryl Dragon – piano, organ, bass on "Bluebirds Over the Mountain"
Ed Carter - bass, tambourine, lead guitar on "Bluebirds Over the Mountain" (August–December 1968)
Mike Kowalski - percussion (August–December 1968)
Unknown horns and possible cello

References

2018 live albums
The Beach Boys live albums
ITunes-exclusive releases
Capitol Records live albums
Albums produced by Mark Linett
Albums produced by Brian Wilson